Youth Front Party (Formerly Penang Front Party, PFP) is a Penang-based-opposition party in Malaysia. The party was originally founded in 2016 with Zahidi Zainul Abidin, the UMNO lawmaker as an advisor, and revived a few months later by Patrick Ooi. As the name suggests, it contested several seats in the then-opposition held state during the Malaysia General Election 2018 but also sent a candidate to Kuala Lumpur. However, they failed in their maiden electoral venture with all their candidates having lost their deposits.

In June 2022, Party Chairman announced that PFP eyed to contest 10 state and parliamentary seats in Penang, and Kedah in the 15th General Election (GE15).  However, in Oct 2022 it was reported by a local news agency indicate that cops arrested an ex-politicians to assist in investigation and probe under Akta Anti Pemerdagangan Orang dan Anti Penyeludupan Migran (ATIPSOM) 2007.     However, according to records from Election Commission Of Malaysia, PFP did not contest in the 2022 general election.It was only party member Razalif Mohd Zain that contested for the Bukit Bendera federal seat as an independent instead of representing the party in the election. He lost the election to Syerleena Abdul Rashid of the Pakatan Harapan (PH) and the Democratic Action Party (DAP) by a minority of 49,054 votes, garnering only 299 votes, which is 0.48% of the total votes and losing the deposit of RM 10,000. For the deposit to be refunded, he has to garner at least 7,812 votes, which is 12.5% of the total votes.

On 17 December 2022, the local news agency reported that the suspect, a 55 years old ex-Penang politician Patrick Ooi Khar Giap was charged under Section 12 of the Anti-Trafficking in Persons and Smuggling of Migrants Act 2007 (ATIPSOM), which carries a maximum 20 years' jail and fine, upon conviction. 

On 22 December 2022, Ooi resigned as party president and handed over the presidency to 32-year-old businessman Razalif Mohd Zain. Ooi then became the party advisor. He also brushed off the allegations that his resignation was linked to his recent court case and clarified that he had already planned to do so earlier and started discussions with incoming president Razalif in September 2022 on the matter of rebranding the party, which is before he was taken legal action in October 2022. Ooi also highlighted that the past 6 years when he served as party president from 2016 to 2022 he had found the lack of space of breakthrough and his belief on Razalif that the latter was able to attract more youngsters to join the party that had led to his resignation as party president. Razalif also added that Ooi would carry on joining the efforts of rebranding the party. He also raised several strategies on the efforts ranging from renaming the party, changing the party logo and attracting the youngsters from 18 to 30 years old. In addition, he welcomed those low-income youngsters and would strive to improve their economic conditions and mulled to provide discount cards for party members that would benefit them by costing them less in shops. He claimed that thousands intended to join the party across the nation and expressed his hope of raising the number of party members from 5,000 to 100,000. He would also assemble 10,000 youngsters at Bukit Jalil National Stadium to rally in support of Prime Minister Anwar Ibrahim but stressed that the party was not joining any political coalitions. Razali also rubbished questions on his qualifications about his past court cases and noted that they had been closed.

Election results

See also

Politics of Malaysia
List of political parties in Malaysia

References

External links
 
 Penang Front Party Singapore elections

Political parties in Malaysia
2016 establishments in Malaysia
Political parties established in 2016